The Longxing is a Go competition in China. It is the Chinese equivalent of the Japanese Ryusei.

Outline
The Longxing is a Go tournament played with fast time controls. As of 2021, the winner receives 200,000 RMB in prize money, and the runner-up receives 80,000 RMB. It is sponsored by the Go / Shogi Channel, a Japanese broadcaster.

Past winners and runners-up

References

External links
Go / Shogi Channel Longxing official website (in Japanese)

Longchen